The Nathan C. Ricker House is a historic house located at 612 West Green Street in Urbana, Illinois. Architect Nathan Clifford Ricker designed the house for himself in 1892; he lived there until his death in 1924. Ricker was a professor at the University of Illinois at Urbana–Champaign, and he established the university's architecture program; he also designed several of the school's buildings. His house, a two-story Queen Anne structure, was his only residential design. The house has an asymmetrical plan with a multi-component roof, projecting bays, and a front porch along the entire west side. Wood shingles decorate the house's exterior, and decorative posts, railings, and a frieze adorn the porch.

The house was added to the National Register of Historic Places on June 21, 2000.

References

Houses on the National Register of Historic Places in Illinois
Queen Anne architecture in Illinois
Houses completed in 1892
National Register of Historic Places in Champaign County, Illinois
Buildings and structures in Urbana, Illinois
Houses in Champaign County, Illinois